Same-sex marriage in Denmark has been legal since 15 June 2012. A bill for the legalization of same-sex marriages was introduced by the Thorning-Schmidt I Cabinet, and approved by the Folketing on 7 June 2012. It received royal assent by Queen Margrethe II on 12 June and took effect three days later. Denmark was the eleventh country in the world to legalize same-sex marriage. It was the first country in the world to enact registered partnerships, which provided same-sex couples with almost all of the rights and benefits of marriage, in 1989.

Same-sex marriage is also legal in the two other constituent countries of the Danish Realm:
 In Greenland, legislation to allow same-sex marriage passed the Inatsisartut on 26 May 2015. The Danish Parliament ratified the legislation on 19 January 2016 and the law took effect on 1 April 2016.
 In the Faroe Islands, same-sex marriage legislation passed the Løgting on 29 April 2016. The legislation was ratified by the Danish Parliament on 25 April 2017 and received royal assent on 3 May. The law took effect on 1 July 2017.

History

Denmark proper

Registered partnerships
Registered partnerships were established in Denmark by a law passed on 7 June 1989, and which came into force on 1 October 1989. It was the first such law in the world. Three attempts to expand the law in May 2003, another in June 2003, and another in June 2006 failed in Parliament. The law was successfully expanded regarding adoption rights and the care of children in June 2009, and in May 2010.

Registered partnerships had almost all the same qualities as marriage. All legal and fiscal rights and obligations were identical to those of opposite-sex marriages, with the following two exceptions:

 laws making explicit reference to the sexes of a married couple did not apply to registered partnerships
 regulations by international treaties did not apply unless all signatories agreed

Divorce for registered partners followed the same rules as opposite-sex divorces. Registered partners had to meet one of the following residency requirements to form a union: (1) one partner had to be a Danish citizen and be resident in Denmark, or (2) both parties must have been resident in Denmark for at least two years. Citizens of Finland, Iceland and Norway were treated as Danish citizens for the purpose of the residency requirement. Additionally, the Justice Ministry could order that a citizen of any other country with a registered partnership law similar to Denmark's be treated as a Danish citizen. Registered partnerships were conducted by civil ceremony only, but the Church of Denmark allowed priests to perform blessings of same-sex relationships.

On 17 March 2009, legislation granting registered partners the right to adopt children jointly was introduced to the Folketing. The bill was approved on 4 May 2010 and took effect on 1 July 2010. On 15 June 2012, the partnership law was repealed and replaced by a gender-neutral marriage law. Entering into new registered partnerships is no longer possible, though existing ones remain valid.

Denmark's role in being the first country in the world to provide almost all of the benefits of marriage to same-sex couples caught international attention. A two-year study of the registered partnership law by researcher Darren Spedale found that same-sex couples were more likely to register their union and less likely to divorce than opposite-sex married couples in Denmark. In particular, same-sex registered partners with children had very low rates of divorce as compared to opposite-sex couples.

Same-sex marriage
In 2006, five Social Liberal MPs introduced a resolution asking the Cabinet of Denmark to draft a gender-neutral marriage law. The resolution was debated in Parliament and opposed by members of the conservative governing coalition. The Minister for the Family, Carina Christensen, argued that registered partners already had the same rights as married partners except for the ability to marry in church, and thus that gender-neutral marriage was unnecessary. In January 2008, the Social Liberal Party's Equality Rapporteur, Lone Dybkjær, called for the legalization of same-sex marriage. The Copenhagen Mayor for Culture and Recreation, Pia Allerslev, from the liberal then-governing Venstre party, also publicly supported same-sex marriage, as did the Lord Mayor of Copenhagen, Ritt Bjerregaard.

In June 2010, the Parliament once again debated a same-sex marriage bill proposed by the opposition parties. It was rejected on a 52–57 vote. A motion calling for legalization was also voted down.

In October 2011, Manu Sareen, the Minister for Equality and Church Affairs, announced that the Thorning-Schmidt I Cabinet was seeking to legalize same-sex marriage by spring 2012. On 18 January 2012, the government published two draft bills. One of the bills would introduce a gender-neutral definition of marriage and allow same-sex couples to marry either in civil registry offices or in the Church of Denmark. In addition, registered partners would be able to convert their union into a marriage. The other bill would allow individual priests to refuse to conduct same-sex marriages. Other religious communities would also be allowed to conduct same-sex marriages but would not be compelled to do so. The bills were under consultation until 22 February 2012.

On 14 March 2012, the cabinet submitted both bills to the Folketing. The bills were approved on 7 June 2012 and received royal assent by Queen Margrethe II on 12 June. The new laws took effect on 15 June 2012. The legislation was opposed by the Danish People's Party and the Christian Democrats, a religious conservative party, although the latter were not represented in the Danish Parliament at that time. Under the law, ministers can refuse to carry out a same-sex marriage ceremony, but the local bishop must arrange a replacement for their church building.

Article 1 of the Marriage Act was amended to read as follows:

Loven finder anvendelse på ægteskab mellem to personer af forskelligt køn og mellem to personer af samme køn.

()In Danish, same-sex marriage is known as ægteskab mellem personer af samme køn or more commonly as homovielse or kønsneutrale ægteskab'' (meaning "gender-neutral marriage").

The first same-sex marriage in Denmark occurred on 15 June at the Frederiksberg Church in Copenhagen between Stig Elling and Steen Andersen, a couple for 27 years who had entered a registered partnership in 1990.

Greenland
 

Denmark's registered partnership law was extended to Greenland on 26 April 1996. Denmark's marriage law, as supported by the Naalakkersuisut, was to be considered by the Inatsisartut in the spring of 2014, but was postponed beyond the year due to early parliamentary elections. The legislation to grant same-sex couples marriage and adoption rights had its first reading on 25 March 2015. It was approved unanimously on second reading on 26 May 2015. Ratification of the legislation was required by the Danish Parliament, which granted approval of the law on 19 January 2016. The law came into effect on 1 April 2016.

Greenland's registered partnership law was repealed on the same day that the same-sex marriage law came into effect.

Faroe Islands

Denmark's registered partnership law was never extended to the Faroe Islands, and until 2017 it was the only Nordic region to not recognize same-sex unions. A set of bills to extend the Danish gender-neutral marriage law to the Faroe Islands was submitted to the Løgting on 20 November 2013, though was rejected at second reading on 13 March 2014.

Following the Faroese general election in September 2015, two same-sex marriage bills (one permitting same-sex marriage and the other permitting same-sex divorce) were submitted to the Parliament. The bills received a first reading on 24 November 2015. On 26 April 2016, following a significant amount of parliamentary maneuvering, the same-sex marriage bill passed its second reading by a vote of 19–14. The bill passed its final reading on 29 April 2016. The Danish Parliament voted unanimously to ratify the changes to its own marriage law on 25 April 2017. The Minister of Justice, Søren Pape Poulsen, subsequently allowed the law to go into effect on 1 July 2017, after some minor adjustments regarding the state church had been made.

Legislation exempting the Church of the Faroe Islands from performing same-sex marriages passed the Faroese Parliament on 30 May and went into effect on 1 July 2017, alongside the marriage law. The first same-sex wedding in the Faroe Islands was performed on 6 September 2017.

Impact
A study by the Danish Research Institute for Suicide Prevention, released in 2019, showed that the legalisation of same-sex marriage, as well as other supportive policies and legislation, had decreased the suicide rate among same-sex partners. The study, conducted in both Sweden and Denmark, found a 46% fall in suicides of people in same-sex unions between the periods 1989–2002 and 2003–2016, compared to 28% among heterosexual couples.

Statistics
Same-sex marriage statistics in Denmark (excluding Greenland and the Faroe Islands) are shown in the table below. In 2021, the majority of same-sex marriages (79%) were performed in a civil ceremony, while 21% took place in a religious ceremony in the Church of Denmark. 1 marriage was performed in embassies or consulates outside of Denmark.

Public opinion
A YouGov poll conducted between 27 December 2012 and 6 January 2013 found that 79% of Danes supported same-sex marriage and 16% were opposed. The remaining 6% had no opinion on the issue. The same poll also showed that 59% supported same-sex couples' right to adopt, 31% were opposed and 11% had no opinion.

A May 2013 Gallup survey from the Faroe Islands found that 68% favoured civil marriage for same-sex couples, with 27% against and 5% undecided. All the regions showed majority support and no age groups had more opponents than supporters. A 2014 poll from the Faroe Islands showed that 62% of respondents supported same-sex marriage. The regional divide was significant; support was greater on Streymoy (71% in Norðurstreymoy and 76% in Suðurstreymoy), which includes the capital Tórshavn, than in Norðoyar (42%) and Eysturoy (48%). An August 2014 Faroese poll asking 600 respondents for their views on civil marriage for same-sex couples showed that 61% supported the idea, while 32% were opposed and 7% had no opinion.

The 2015 Eurobarometer found that 87% of Danes supported same-sex marriage, while 9% were opposed and 4% were undecided.

A Pew Research Center poll, conducted between April and August 2017 and published in May 2018, showed that 86% of Danes supported same-sex marriage, 9% were opposed and 5% did not know or refused to answer. When divided by religion, 92% of religiously unaffiliated people, 87% of non-practicing Christians and 74% of church-attending Christians supported same-sex marriage. Among 18–34-year-olds, opposition to same-sex marriage was 6%.

The 2019 Eurobarometer found that 89% of Danes thought same-sex marriage should be allowed throughout Europe, while 8% were opposed.

See also

Axel and Eigil Axgil
 LGBT rights in Denmark
 LGBT rights in the Faroe Islands
 LGBT rights in Greenland
 Recognition of same-sex unions in Europe

References

 
2012 in LGBT history